United States gubernatorial elections were held in 1935, in three states. Kentucky, Louisiana and Mississippi hold their gubernatorial elections in odd numbered years, every 4 years, preceding the United States presidential election year.

Results

References

Notes

 
November 1935 events